Oak Park is an unincorporated community in Ventura County, California, United States. When developed in the Simi Hills in the late 1960s, a single road provided the only access to the community from Agoura Hills, California, in neighboring Los Angeles County. As of the 2010 census, Oak Park had a population of 14,266, down from 14,625 at the 2000 census. For statistical purposes, the United States Census Bureau has defined Oak Park as a census-designated place (CDP). The census definition of the area may not precisely correspond to local understanding of the area with the same name.

Oak Park is the biggest unincorporated community in Ventura County. Residents of the community have through votes declined to set up an independent city, and also declined to be annexed into neighboring Thousand Oaks.

History

Oak Park has had human occupation from about 5500 B.C. to the present day. It lies within a zone including the early Millingstone Horizon and inland Chumash Indians. Indians camped throughout the area as they collected acorns, yucca, and other food. The sites in the area include major villages, smaller camps and several rock shelters. Chumash people lived here for thousands of years prior to European contact. They lived off of trading, gathering and hunting. The Chumash originally settled in Oak Park due to an abundance of natural resources, including fresh water, acorns and rabbit-hunting. It is one of the oldest occupied places in California.

The location of Oak Park was originally part of Rancho Simi, a Spanish land concession in Alta California given in 1795 to Francisco Javier Pico, a soldier of the Santa Barbara company, and his two brothers, Patricio Pico and Miguel Pico by the Spanish government. Lindero Canyon Road follows the western border-line (lindero in Spanish) of the land grant.

Throughout the 20th century, studios used the area to film movies and in particular westerns. Movies filmed locally include The Red Pony and A Walk in the Sun.

Oak Park was formed from ranchland owned by Jim and Marian Jordan, stars of the radio show Fibber McGee and Molly. The land was purchased by Metropolitan Development Corporation in the 1960s. Homes were developed starting in the late 1960s. Kanan-Dume Road (named after a local family) was the only access road to the community, from Agoura Hills, California, in neighboring Los Angeles County.

In 1967 Ventura County officials who were concerned about the isolation of the community proposed a land swap with L.A. County, but they were rebuffed. The isolation—coupled with the distance to junior and senior high schools—also drove down the property values, and homeowners found it difficult to sell their properties.

The Ventura County Board of Supervisors created a Municipal Advisory Council (MAC) in 1975 to represent the community to County agencies. The MAC persuaded the Ventura County Board of Supervisors to trim Metropolitan Development Corp.'s initial development plan from a population of 26,000. Today there are about 15,000 residents. All available land within Oak Park has now been developed, with the remaining vacant land owned by the Rancho Simi Recreation and Park District.

Since the Simi Valley Unified School District had no plans to build post-elementary schools in Oak Park, the residents seceded and formed Oak Park Unified School District in June 1977. Medea Creek Middle School started at the current location of the school district in 1980 using portable classrooms. The campus was affectionately called "Bungalow Hill" by students. The middle school was grades 6-8, with sixth-graders spending morning hours at Brookside Elementary and afternoons at the middle school. The following year when Oak Park High School opened for classes, Medea Creek Middle School shared the campus. Oak Park High School's class of 1983 was the first graduating class. They were the maiden class; they were upperclassmen each year ninth through 12th grade.

In 1999 the United States Postal Service assigned Oak Park its own ZIP code, 91377. Oak Park previously shared the ZIP code 91301 with its neighboring town of Agoura Hills.

Geography 
Oak Park is situated in southeastern Ventura County. It is bordered on the west by North Ranch (Thousand Oaks) and on the south by the LA County cities of Agoura Hills and Westlake Village. It borders the Santa Monica Mountains National Recreation Area to the east and north.

Oak Park is located at 34°10'18" North, 118°45'28" West (34.171756, -118.757899). It is bordered by the Santa Monica Mountains National Recreational Area on the north and east and Rancho Simi Open Space on the south. It sits within valleys in the Simi Hills capped by Simi Peak which borders the community to the north. The elevation in Oak Park varies from 960 to 2,157 feet above sea level. (Does not include Simi Peak at 2,450 ft)

All of the area is land and none of it is covered by water. However, there are many small creeks in the area. The largest of these creeks are Medea Creek and Lindero Creek, which are tributaries of Malibu Creek, the only waterway that pierces the Santa Monica Mountains. The Malibu Creek watershed covers 105 square miles and contains 225 stream segments.

Demographics 
As of 2012, Oak Park was home to 14,300 residents and 5,200 housing units.

2010
At the 2010 census Oak Park had a population of 14,266. The racial makeup of Oak Park was 11,473 (83.1%) White, 141 (1.0%) African American, 32 (0.2%) Native American, 1,556 (11.3%) Asian, 9 (0.1%) Pacific Islander, 162 (1.2%) from other races, and 438 (3.2%) from two or more races. Hispanic or Latino of any race were 826 people (6.0%).

The census reported that 14,625 people (100% of the population) lived in households, and none (0%) were institutionalized.

There were 5,158 households, 2,112 (40.9%) had children under the age of 18 living in them, 3,054 (59.2%) were opposite-sex married couples living together, 590 (11.4%) had a female householder with no husband present, 184 (3.6%) had a male householder with no wife present.  There were 204 (4.0%) unmarried opposite-sex partnerships, and 34 (0.7%) same-sex married couples or partnerships. 1,046 households (20.3%) were one person and 258 (5.0%) had someone living alone who was 65 or older. The average household size was 2.68.  There were 3,828 families (74.2% of households); the average family size was 3.14.

The age distribution was 3,622 people (26.2%) under the age of 18, 1,004 people (7.3%) aged 18 to 24, 3,031 people (21.9%) aged 25 to 44, 4,981 people (36.1%) aged 45 to 64, and 1,173 people (8.5%) who were 65 or older.  The median age was 41.7 years. For every 100 females, there were 92.6 males.  For every 100 females age 18 and over, there were 88.5 males.

There were 5,297 housing units at an average density of 1,001.2 per square mile, of the occupied units 3,842 (74.5%) were owner-occupied and 1,316 (25.5%) were rented. The homeowner vacancy rate was 1.2%; the rental vacancy rate was 3.5%.  10,706 people (77.5% of the population) lived in owner-occupied housing units and 3,104 people (22.5%) lived in rental housing units.

2000
At the 2000 census, there were 14,625 people in approximately 5000 households. The racial makeup of the town was 92.41% White, 0.01% African American, 0.26% Native American, 6.41% Asian, 0.23% Pacific Islander, 1.16% from other races, and 2.59% from two or more races. 4.35% of the population were Hispanic or Latino of any race.

49.7% of the households had children under the age of 18 living with them, 76.7% were married couples living together, 9.2% had a female householder with no husband present, and 11.5% were non-families. 8.7% of households were one person and 2.9% had someone living alone who was 65 or older. The average household size was 3.11 and the average family size was 2.83.

The age distribution was 33% under the age of 18, 5.5% from 18 to 24, 25.2% from 25 to 44, 31.4% from 45 to 64, and 5% 65 or older. The median age was 36.3 years. For every 100 females, there were 97.8 males. For every 100 females age 18 and over, there were 94.4 males.

The median household income was $106,921 and the median family income  was $121,170. Males had a median income of $91,698 versus $42,083 for females. The per capita income for the town was $33,905. 7.5% of the population and 5.6% of families were below the poverty line. Out of the total people living in poverty, 8.4% were under the age of 18 and 0.0% were 65 or older.

Education 
Among residents age 25 or greater, 11% have no education beyond a high school diploma, 22% have some college education without earning a degree, 10% have an associate degree, 35% have a bachelor's degree, and 18% have advanced degrees.

The community is served by the Oak Park Unified School District (OPUSD), which has three elementary schools K-5 (Brookside Elementary, Oak Hills Elementary and Red Oak Elementary), a middle school 6-8 (Medea Creek Middle School), Oak Park High School (9-12), Oak Park Independent School (K-12), and Oak View High School (an alternative high school for ages 16 and above). Oak Park Unified School District was originally part of the Simi Valley Unified School District, but successfully seceded from SVUSD via election in 1977.

Oak Park High School offers a variety of sports including baseball, boys and girls basketball, cheer, Cross Country, dance, football, golf, lacrosse, boys and girls soccer, softball, boys and girls tennis, track and field, and boys and girls volleyball. Oak Park is in the Tri-Valley and Frontier League depending on the sport. Oak Park High School's music program includes band, choir, and marching band.

Notable people

Doja Cat, singer and rapper
Zachary Gordon
Peyton List
Christopher Hoag
Zack Thornton, baseball player
Curran Walters

Flora and fauna

An Environmental Impact Assessment of Oak Park was conducted in 1982 which recorded local flora and fauna

Fauna

85 species of birds have been observed with breeding activity of 32-64 probable. 12 species of raptors were observed. Nesting of 7 was confirmed including American kestrel (Falco sparverius), barn owl (Tyto alba), screech owl (Otus asio), red-shouldered hawk (Buteo lineatus). The turkey vulture (Cathartes aura) and the prairie falcon (Falco mexicanus) breed on adjacent slopes. Cooper’s hawk (Accipiter cooperi) and northern harrier (Circus cyanus) may nest in Oak Park. Golden eagles (Aquila chrysaetos) lack suitable nesting habitats and probably live in nearby areas. Two non-raptor birds are classified as sensitive including coastal black-tailed gnatcatcher (Polioptila melanura californica). Possibly less than 1600 pairs of this bird remain alive. The second is grasshopper sparrow (Ammodramus savannarum).

5 species of reptiles were observed including the western fence lizard (Sceloporus occidentalis) and western rattlesnake (Crotalus viridis) and more may exist.

Three species of amphibians were observed in Oak Park: western toad (Bufo boreas), Pacific treefrog (Hyla regilla), and bullfrog (Rana catesbeiana). 8 other amphibians occur in this area and may be present.

35 mammals may be present including bobcat (Felis rufus), coyote (Canis latrans), and desert cottontail (Sylvilagus auduboni).

The Oak Park area and the Simi Hills are part of a wildlife corridor that link the San Gabriel Mountains (Los Padre National Forest) and Santa Susana Mountains to the Santa Monica Mountains. This is a critical path between mountain ranges where animals can find others of the same species for mating.

Flora
Oak Park ecosystems include several within the chaparral (inland sage scrub, rocklands, northern slope chaparral scrub, southern slope chaparral scrub) and riparian woodland (coast live oak riparian forest, valley oak woodland, southern willow scrub, walnut stands, and oak savanna). Southern California grassland has largely disappeared from the site by overgrazing and housing.

The chaparral and grassland are frequently altered by fires started by natural causes and humans. Both Indians and ranchers have altered the local landscape through fire and grazing. Oak Park had a large uncontrolled fire on October 8, 1982. The most recent uncontrolled fire was the Woolsey Fire on November 8–9, 2018 that burned through Oak Park and surrounding areas.

The recorded flora during the last EIR of Oak Park included 202 vascular plant species distributed among 52 families. Half are found in 5 families: sunflower(Asteraceace), grass (Poaceae), pea (Fabaceae), Mustard (Brassicaceae) and figwort (Scrophulariaceae). Non-native plants constitute 13% of the flora. There are 4 plants classified as sensitive: Catalina Mariposa Lilly (Calochortus catalinae), Wind poppy (Stylomecon heterophylla), Santa Susana Tarweed (Hemizonia minthornii ), and Nolina Parii

Infrastructure
Water is provided by the Calleguas Municipal Water District though the Las Virgenes Municipal Water District. Oak Park sewage is collected and treated by the Triunfo County Sanitation District at the Tapia Water Reclamation Facility on Malibu Canyon Road in Los Angeles County. A joint venture of Calleguas, Las Virgenes and the Triunfo built a pipeline and pump station in 1994 to distribute reclaimed water for landscaping and golf course irrigation.

Libraries
Public Libraries: Ventura County Library—one of their branches is in Oak Park; Oak Park Library and also, the nearby Agoura branch of the County of Los Angeles Public Library.

Recreation

Open space and parks in Oak Park are managed by the Rancho Simi Recreation and Park District.

Open Space
 Rock Ridge Open Space
 Sunrise Meadows Open Space
 Wistful Vista Open Space

Parks
 Chaparral Park
 Deerhill Park
 Eagle View Park
 Indian Springs Park
 Mae Boyar Park
 Medea Creek Park Trail
Oak Canyon Community Park
 Oak Park Community Garden
Oak Park Community Center and Gardens
Valley View Park

Trails
 Canyon Cove Trail (to Wistful Vista Ridge)
 China Flat / Simi Peak
 Golden Eagle Trail aka Rock Ridge Trail West
 Medea Creek Trail
 Oak Canyon Community Park Nature Trail
Palo Camado Canyon / Doubletree 
 Sandstone Hills Trail
 Suicide aka Rock Ridge Trail East
 Sunrise Meadow Trails - Creekside and Ridge
 Wistful Vista Trail

Oak Park borders the Santa Monica Mountains National Recreation Area. Trails are used for hiking, running, horseback riding, climbing, and mountain biking.

References

External links
Oak Park Now — news and events.
Rancho Simi Parks and Recreation website

 
Census-designated places in Ventura County, California
Conejo Valley
Simi Hills
Census-designated places in California